Phyllanthus maderaspatensis is a perennial herbaceous species of plant in the family Phyllanthaceae, widespread in tropical and subtropical areas of the old world.

Uses

India
The plant is widely used in Indian medicine for treatment of headaches.
Indian herbal medicine for liver troubles called Bhumyamlaki might use the plant.

Africa

Tanzania
The pounded form of the whole plant is applied to scabies.

Niger
The plant is used as an aphrodisiac.

Kenya
The smoke from the burning plants is used to exterminate caterpillars in maize.

References

maderaspatensis
Taxa named by Carl Linnaeus